Greig Oliver (born 12 September 1964) is a rugby union player development officer and formerly played as a scrum-half. He made three appearances for the Scotland national rugby union team. He is the assistant coach of Ireland's under-20 squad.

Oliver was born in Hawick.

Playing career
Oliver made his international debut at the 1987 Rugby World Cup against Zimbabwe at Wellington. His final international appearance was against Zimbabwe at Murrayfield in the 1991 Rugby World Cup.

Coaching
He was the director of rugby at Garryowen.

He became an elite player development officer at Munster Rugby, and the assistant coach of the Ireland national under-20 rugby union team.

References

External links
 profile at Irish Rugby

1964 births
Living people
Hawick Trades players
Rugby union players from Hawick
Rugby union scrum-halves
Scotland international rugby union players
Scottish rugby union players